Strandebarm is a former municipality in the old Hordaland county, Norway. The original municipality was large, spanning both sides of the central part of the Hardangerfjorden. It also included the island of Varaldsøy. The municipality included land in the present-day municipalities of Ullensvang, Kvam, and Kvinnherad. The administrative center of the municipality was the village of Bru, where Strandebarm Church is located.

One of the larger industries in the municipality was shipbuilding, centered at the village of Omastranda, where the company Fjellstrand A.S. is headquartered.

The Norwegian writer Hans E. Kinck lived in Strandebarm for many years, and is said to have used the village as setting and inspiration for his novel Den nye kapellanen ("The New Vicar").

History
The parish of Strandebarm was established as a municipality on 1 January 1838 (see formannskapsdistrikt law). On 1 January 1863, most (but not all) of Strandebarm located on the eastern shore of the Hardangerfjorden (population: 1,663) was separated from Strandebarm to constitute the new municipality of Jondal. This left Strandebarm with 2,200 residents.  Then on 1 January 1902, the southern district (population: 848) was separated to become the new municipality of Varaldsøy, leaving Strandebarm with a population of 1,661.

During the 1960s, there were many municipal mergers across Norway due to the work of the Schei Committee. On 1 January 1965, Strandebarm municipality ceased to exist. The district of Kysnesstranda (population: 100) on the east side of the fjord was incorporated into Jondal Municipality. The rest of Strandebarm (population: 1,545) was incorporated into Kvam Municipality to the north.

Municipal council
The municipal council  of Strandebarm was made up of 13 representatives that were elected to four year terms.  The party breakdown of the final municipal council was as follows:

See also
List of former municipalities of Norway

References

Kvam
Former municipalities of Norway
1838 establishments in Norway
1965 disestablishments in Norway